Kingsman: The Golden Circle is a 2017 spy action comedy film directed by Matthew Vaughn and written by Jane Goldman and Vaughn. Based on the comic book series The Secret Service (later retitled to Kingsman) by Mark Millar and Dave Gibbons, the film serves as the second installment in the Kingsman film series and the sequel to Kingsman: The Secret Service (2014). The film features an ensemble cast consisting of Colin Firth, Taron Egerton, Mark Strong, Edward Holcroft, Hanna Alström, and Sophie Cookson, who reprise their roles from the first film, with Julianne Moore, Halle Berry, Pedro Pascal, Elton John, Channing Tatum, and Jeff Bridges joining the cast. The film follows members of Kingsman needing to team up with their American counterpart, Statesman, after their organization is crippled and  the world is held hostage by Poppy Adams and her drug cartel, "The Golden Circle".

Kingsman: The Golden Circle premiered in London on 18 September 2017 and was theatrically released in the United Kingdom on 20 September 2017 in 3D and 2D and the United States on 22 September 2017 in IMAX, by 20th Century Fox. It grossed $410 million worldwide against a budget of $104 million and received mixed reviews from critics, with the film's long running time targeted for criticism and its new characters and stylized action garnering polarized responses, though the acting and humor were praised.

A prequel, The King's Man, was theatrically released in the United States on 22 December 2021, while a sequel is scheduled for a 2023 release.

Plot

One year after the defeat of Richmond Valentine, Gary "Eggsy" Unwin has officially joined the Kingsman intelligence service, taking his late mentor Harry Hart's title of “Galahad”, and begun a relationship with Tilde, Crown Princess of Sweden. He is ambushed by Charlie Hesketh, a former Kingsman trainee who lost his arm and vocal cords during the Valentine incident, replacing them with cybernetics. Eggsy evades Charlie and his henchmen in a car chase across London, but Charlie's severed cybernetic arm hacks into the Kingsman database through Eggsy's car. Charlie passes the information to Poppy Adams — leader of the world's largest drug cartel, the Golden Circle — who launches a volley of missiles that destroy the Kingsman headquarters and wipes out all its agents in Britain, aside from Eggsy and Merlin, Kingsman's tech support.

Kingsman’s emergency protocol leads Eggsy and Merlin to Statesman, an American private intelligence service posing as a Bourbon whiskey distillery in Kentucky, as well as Kingsman's American counterpart. There, they discover that Harry survived his shooting thanks to Statesman nanotechnology, but is suffering from amnesia. They also learn about the Golden Circle from Statesman head Champagne, and the two agencies agree to work together to bring the cartel down. Statesman agent Tequila later develops a blue rash and shows signs of mania, and is replaced by agent Whiskey as Eggsy's partner. Eggsy plants a tracking device on Charlie's ex-girlfriend Clara Von Gluckfberg during a sexual encounter at Glastonbury Festival, but his revelation of the mission to Tilde strains their relationship.

Eggsy cures Harry's amnesia by threatening to shoot a Cairn Terrier puppy that resembles Harry's late dog, shortly before Poppy broadcasts a message to the world about a toxin she has secretly added to all her drugs, which causes users to develop symptoms like Tequila's before paralysis and, ultimately, death. She offers the antidote if the President of the United States ends his country's war on drugs and grants her cartel immunity from prosecution. The President decides to quarantine everyone affected, including Chief of Staff Fox, intending to let them all die to put Poppy out of business and rid the world of drug users, whom he sees as criminals.

Eggsy, Harry, and Whiskey track Clara to the Golden Circle's antidote factory in the mountains of Italy. Eggsy steals an antidote sample, which is broken by Whiskey during an ambush by the Golden Circle's henchmen, leading Harry to suspect him of working against them. Harry shoots Whiskey in the head, but Eggsy, believing Harry to be delusional as a result of his recovery, saves him with nanotechnology as Charlie destroys the antidote factory, killing Clara for unwittingly betraying the Golden Circle. Tilde calls Eggsy in a manic state, revealing she has been affected by the blue rash after taking drugs due to her stress over Eggsy's infidelity. Eggsy, Harry, and Merlin discover the location of Poppy's hideout, "Poppy Land", in Cambodia and fly there to steal the laptop which can deploy the drones carrying the antidote.

Arriving at Poppy Land, Eggsy steps on a land mine, but Merlin switches places with Eggsy and sacrifices himself instead. Storming the lair, Eggsy kills Charlie while Harry destroys Poppy's robotic attack dogs with the help of Elton John, who had been kidnapped by Poppy. They secure the laptop and inject Poppy with a concentrated dose of her own toxin-infused heroin. Poppy gives them the laptop password in a drugged state, but dies from an overdose due to the heroin. Whiskey interrupts them before they can deploy the drones, revealing that he wants all drug users to die after his pregnant wife was killed in a robbery by meth addicts. Eggsy and Harry fight and kill Whiskey by throwing him headfirst into a industrial-grade meat grinder, then deploy the drones to release the antidote, saving the affected victims throughout the world.

The President is impeached for conspiring to commit genocide against drug victims, and Statesman purchases a distillery in Scotland to help rebuild Kingsman. Statesman tech support specialist Ginger Ale is appointed to Whiskey’s position, Eggsy marries Princess Tilde, and Tequila takes an exchange assignment at Kingsman (presumably as partial punishment for his implied drug use), which acquires a new tailor shop in London.

Cast

 Colin Firth as Harry Hart / Galahad
 Taron Egerton as Gary "Eggsy" Unwin / Galahad
 Mark Strong as Hamish Mycroft / Merlin
 Julianne Moore as Poppy Adams
 Halle Berry as Ginger
 Pedro Pascal as Jack Daniels / Agent Whiskey
 Elton John as himself
 Channing Tatum as Agent Tequila
 Jeff Bridges as Champagne "Champ"
 Edward Holcroft as Charles "Charlie" Hesketh
 Hanna Alström as Tilde, Crown Princess of Sweden
 Bruce Greenwood as the President of the United States
 Emily Watson as Chief of Staff Fox
 Sophie Cookson as Roxanne "Roxy" Morton / Lancelot
 Michael Gambon as Sir Giles / Arthur

Flashback footage from The Secret Service includes Samuel L. Jackson and Sofia Boutella as Richmond Valentine and Gazelle, respectively. Tobias Bakare and Theo Barklem-Biggs return as Eggsy's friends Jamal and Ryan, with Thomas Turgoose and Calvin Demba introduced as two of Eggsy's other friends, Liam and Brandon. Furthermore, Samantha Womack makes a brief return appearance as Michelle Unwin, Eggsy's mother. Additionally, Poppy Delevingne portrays Clara Von Gluckfberg, Charlie's ex-girlfriend whom Eggsy meets; Keith Allen and Tom Benedict Knight feature as Charles and Angel, two of Poppy's henchmen; Björn Granath (in his final film performance) and Lena Endre feature as the King and Queen of Sweden, respectively; James Caroll Jordan appears as Guy Clark, one of Poppy's professors at Harvard University; and Mark Arnold portrays General McCoy, an advisor to the president of the United States. Shannon Bream and Bill Hemmer of Fox News – at the time a sister operation to 20th Century Fox – appear as themselves. Paintings of uncredited extras (created for The Secret Service) are used to represent founder members of the Kingsman organization, later established in The King's Man to be named Orlando, Duke of Oxford, Archie Reid, George V, and Bedivere.

Production

Development
Near the release of Kingsman: The Secret Service, Mark Millar and Matthew Vaughn said a sequel would be possible if the first film was to perform well at the box office, and Vaughn expressed interest in returning to direct. Vaughn also noted that he had hoped to have Firth back in the sequel, though it was later stated that Firth would not be returning.

On 29 April 2015, Fox announced that a sequel was in production, but that it was unclear if Vaughn would return due to his interest in directing a Flash Gordon film. On 11 June 2015, Vaughn told Yahoo that he had begun writing the script for the sequel, and that he could return to direct. In September 2015, Millar reiterated that the sequel was in development and that Vaughn was looking for ways to bring Firth back without sacrificing the integrity of the story. Later that month, The Hollywood Reporter confirmed that Egerton had also signed on for a new Robin Hood film, which was then set to begin shooting in February 2016; Egerton's schedule was thus in conflict with the Kingsman sequel. However, in mid-October, it was confirmed that scheduling issues had been settled between both studios. Lionsgate began Robin Hoods production right after Egerton wrapped filming on Kingsman: The Golden Circle, which began in May 2016.

Casting

On 17 February 2016, it was revealed that Julianne Moore was in negotiations to play the villain in the film. On 10 March 2016, Halle Berry was cast in the film, in a role that later turned out to be the Statesman's tech support. In late March, Vaughn confirmed Berry's and Moore's casting, as well as the title, Kingsman: The Golden Circle. On 8 April 2016, Pedro Pascal was cast in the film as Jack Daniels, and on the same day, a promotional poster was released featuring Firth's character's glasses, confirming Firth's return for the film; Firth's return was later officially confirmed on 11 July 2016. Channing Tatum confirmed his casting through his Twitter account, while Variety reported that Elton John was in talks for a role. (John would later be portrayed by co-star Egerton in 2019 movie Rocketman.) In late April, Vaughn talked about writing the sequel, and stated "writing this was the hardest thing I've ever done." Jeff Bridges was added to the cast on 28 May 2016. Vinnie Jones announced on Twitter that he had been cast, though he did not appear in the finished film.

Filming
Principal photography on the film began on 15 May 2016 in Birmingham. Filming also took place in Warner Bros. Studios, Leavesden. The cable car and antidote factory scenes were shot on Skyway Monte Bianco and Pointe Helbronner, located in Courmayeur, Aosta Valley, in northern Italy. On 13 September 2016, Kingsman: The Golden Circle completed initial filming. Additional footage was filmed on location in London in December 2016.

Music

Henry Jackman and Matthew Margeson reunited to compose the music for the film. The soundtrack was released on iTunes on 22 September 2017 by Fox Music and was released on CD in October 2017 by La-La Land Records.

Release
20th Century Fox originally scheduled Kingsman: The Golden Circle for a summer release date of 16 June 2017 but pushed the film back to 6 October 2017. The film was then moved up to 20 September in the United Kingdom and 22 September 2017 in the United States likely to avoid competition with Blade Runner 2049. The film had an IMAX release.

The film was banned from cinemas in Cambodia since the villains' base is located in the ruins of a Cambodian temple.

Marketing
On 20 July 2017, Fox released an animated Kingsman/Archer crossover short film featuring Eggsy and Sterling Archer. On 18 September, Fox released a TV advert featuring a mock Kingsman board game.

The beige bomber jacket for Channing Tatum's character and a shearling coat worn by Colin Firth's Harry Hart were tailored by Cromford Leather, a UK designer brand and maker of luxury leather clothing. In May 2017, TAG Heuer partnered with Fox to make the TAG Heuer Connected the official watch of the Kingsman agents. In August 2017, Fox partnered with Old Forester to release a Statesman edition of their 95 proof Bourbon whisky for the U.S. market. In addition, GlenDronach released a Kingsman Edition 1991 of their scotch whisky. Director Vaughn cited GlenDronach as his favourite scotch whisky brand, and the distillery used casks from 1991, as it is the fictional year of Eggsy's birth. Only 240 bottles have been allocated to the U.S. market, all of which are signed by Vaughn. In addition, Berry Bros. & Rudd released a Kingsman edition of their No. 3 London Dry Gin. In September 2017, Hard Rock Cafe introduced the "Poppy Burger" in their menu to promote the film.

On 8 September 2017, luxury retailer Mr Porter opened its first Kingsman shop between Berry Bros. & Rudd and Lock & Co. Hatters on St James's Street in Central London. Both the Kingsman shop and Berry Bros. & Rudd were integral locations for this film, while Lock & Co. was featured in the first film.

In collaboration with German cosmetic line ARTDECO, ex-model and producer Claudia Schiffer unveiled the Claudia Schiffer Makeup line which featured two products inspired by the film—a 'Poppyland' lipstick and a 'Kingsman' nail polish. Additionally, products from that range were used for Poppy's Salon in the film.

Video games
In August 2017, it was confirmed that Kingsman: The Golden Circle would have a tie-in game to accompany its release, and that it would be a turn-based match-3 role-playing combat game, released on iOS and Android by the Korean mobile game company NHN PixelCube. The game also includes characters from Kingsman: The Secret Service, and was released globally on 14 September 2017, about a week before the film's release. Unlike the films, the game does not have graphic violence or explicit language, but it is classified a "12+" rating for "mild realistic violence". In the days before the film's release, another mobile game based on the Kingsman franchise, simply titled Kingsman: The Secret Service, was announced to be in development also for iOS and Android, by American mobile game developer YesGnome. The game is a hybrid action adventure-construction simulator, where players construct impregnable secret bases, similar to Fallout Shelter, while infiltrating enemy bases in run-and-gun missions based on the plot of at least the first film. The Android version remained in early access for many months. The Golden Circle is free-to-play, offers in-app purchases, and supports online player-versus-player multiplayer, while The Secret Service is sold as a paid game.

Several months later after the launch of the tie-in mobile game for Kingsman: The Golden Circle, on 24 April 2018, it was announced that the game's servers will be shut down on 23 May 2018, after "careful consideration" and the game's poor player base. Meanwhile, after many months in early access, Yesgnome's Kingsman: The Secret Service was finally released on 1 May 2019.

Home media
The film was released on Blu-ray on 12 December 2017 and DVD. A Target exclusive gift set includes four whiskey stones. The Walmart exclusive gift set comes with a Funko Pocket Pop! Eggsy keychain. A limited-edition steelbook packaging was available exclusively at Best Buy in the U.S., HMV in the UK, and JB Hi-Fi in Australia.

Reception

Box office
Kingsman: The Golden Circle grossed $100.2 million in the United States and Canada and $310.7 million in other territories for a worldwide total of $410.9 million, against a production budget of $104 million.

In North America, the film was released alongside The Lego Ninjago Movie and Friend Request and was projected to gross $40–45 million from 4,003 theatres in its opening weekend. It made $3.4 million from Thursday night previews at 3,100 theatres up from the $1.4 million made by the first film and $15.3 million on its first day. It went on to open to $39 million, an increase over the first film's $36.2 million debuts and topping the box office, overtaking two-time defender It. In its second week, the film initially made a projected gross of $16.9 million, finishing second at the box office behind It. However, the following day, actual results had the film finishing atop It by a gross of $16.93 million to $16.90 million and also beat out newcomer American Made ($16.8 million). The film made $8.7 million and $5.4 million in its third and fourth weeks, finishing 5th and 7th, respectively. The film dropped 44% in its fifth weekend, making $3.0 million and falling to 5th.

Critical response
Kingsman: The Golden Circle received mixed reviews. On review aggregator Rotten Tomatoes, the film has an approval rating of 51% based on reviews from 306 critics, with an average rating of 5.4/10. The website's critical consensus reads "Kingsman: The Golden Circle offers more of everything that made its predecessor so much fun but lacks the original's wild creative spark". On Metacritic, the film has a weighted average score of 44 out of 100, based on 44 critics indicating "mixed or average reviews". Audiences polled by CinemaScore gave the film an average grade of "B+" on an A+ to F scale, the same score earned by its predecessor.

Writing for Uproxx, Amy Nicholson called the film better than the first and wrote: "Kingsman: The Golden Circle has matured just enough. It's doubled down on the mayhem and hammered out the tone. Everything is sincere even when it's insane". Writing for Rolling Stone, Peter Travers gave the film 2.5 stars out of 4 and wrote: 

Christopher Orr from The Atlantic said in his review "The movie is too long, too violent, too silly – too everything. Yet for those who enjoyed the original Kingsman, it is a more than adequate second act. To put it another way: First time satire, second time farce".

Michael Phillips of the Chicago Tribune gave the film 1.5 stars and said "Kingsman: The Golden Circle offers everything – several bored Oscar winners; two scenes featuring death by meat grinder; Elton John, mugging in close-up – except a good time". Wendy Ide, reviewing the film for The Guardian, gave it 1 star and called it "a knowing sneer of a movie that shrugs off its plot holes along with a particularly unsavoury attitude to violence and a tendency to use female characters as the decorative punchline to jokes". Writing for RogerEbert.com, Glenn Kenny gave the film 0 out of 4 and wrote: "As action-packed as the movie is, it feels like it's six hours. That's in part because the pacing is so spavined; the movie lurches twitchily from set piece to set piece and spends inordinate amounts of time on shots of its sharp-dressed characters slow-motioning into the widescreen frames showing off accessories that will be sold to you by various companies in various Kingsman tie-ins all over the Internet."

Accolades
Kingsman: The Golden Circle was nominated in four categories at the 2018 Golden Trailer Awards: "Team" (Create Advertising Group) for Best Action, "Poppy Dance" (Trailer Park, Inc.) for Best Action TV Spot (for a Feature Film) and Most Original TV Spot (for a Feature Film), and "Summer" for Best Radio / Audio Spot. The film won the Empire Award for Best Thriller at the 23rd Empire Awards.
At the 44th Saturn Awards, it received a nomination for Best Action or Adventure Film.

Franchise

Sequel and prequel

Vaughn has stated that he and Goldman have a third Kingsman film planned. Although Vaughn initially suggested the series would be a trilogy, Mark Millar later confirmed at least two more films were in development. In December 2017, Vaughn provided insight into his plans for the untitled third film. He confirmed there would be one "massive" new addition to the cast, though he has not decided who would play the role yet. In March 2018, Vaughn confirmed he was still working on the script for the third film. Although he did not reveal any new plot details, he said he has something big planned for it. In another interview, he teased the possible return of Mark Strong's Merlin, but did not confirm or deny the rumours. Vaughn revealed to Empire that he's planning a Kingsman movie which would cap-off the "Harry Hart-Eggsy relationship" trilogy. In May 2019, Vaughn told Digital Spy in an interview that "Kingsman 3" would be the final chapter of Hart and Eggsy.

A prequel to the franchise, The King's Man was released on December 22, 2021. On 9 November 2018, Egerton confirmed he would not appear for the prequel; however, he would still portray the character in future installments, saying "I don't know how hot off the press this is, and I think I'm allowed to say it, but I'm not in the next Kingsman movie. That doesn't mean I won't be in Kingsman ever again. I was with Matthew Vaughn as little as a few days ago, we're still very much in business together, but his next journey in that world doesn't involve me." Before adding "His idea for the new one is incredibly exciting," Egerton continued. "I'm sad that I won't be on that journey with him but it's not the last you've seen of Eggsy." In December 2021, Vaughn revealed that filming on the sequel will begin in September 2022, for a 2023 release but Egerton believes that the third film will start in 2023.

References

External links

 
 
 

2017 films
2017 action comedy films
2010s adventure comedy films
2010s spy comedy films
20th Century Fox films
American action adventure films
American action comedy films
American adventure comedy films
American robot films
American sequel films
American spy comedy films
British action adventure films
British action comedy films
British adventure comedy films
British sequel films
British spy comedy films
Films about cannibalism
Cultural depictions of Elton John
Cyborg films
2010s English-language films
Fictional intelligence agencies
Films about amnesia
Films about drugs
Films about the illegal drug trade
British films about revenge
American films about revenge
Films about terrorism
Films based on American comics
Films directed by Matthew Vaughn
Films produced by Matthew Vaughn
Films scored by Henry Jackman
Films scored by Matthew Margeson
Films set in 2015
Films set in Cambodia
Films set in England
Films set in Italy
Films set in Kentucky
Films set in London
Films set in Sweden
Films set in Washington, D.C.
Films set in New York City
Films shot in England
Films shot in Italy
Films shot in London
Films shot at Warner Bros. Studios, Leavesden
Censored films
Film controversies
Kingsman (franchise) films
Films with screenplays by Jane Goldman
Films with screenplays by Matthew Vaughn
TSG Entertainment films
2010s American films
American spy action films